Garki Hospital is a 100-bed hospital in Abuja, Nigeria, owned by the Federal Capital Territory Administration (FCTA), and one of a few hospitals in the country that carry out renal transplants. In 2013, surgeons Nadey Hakim and Elijah Miner performed the first kidney transplant at the hospital.

References

Hospitals in Nigeria